Giovanni Prandini (1940–2018) was an Italian politician who was a member of the Christian Democrats. He served as minister of merchant navy between 1987 and 1989 and minister of public works between 1989 and 1991. He was the first Italian politician who hold the post of the merchant navy minister.

Biography
Prandini was born in Calvisano, Brescia, on 22 January 1940. He obtained a degree in economics and business. He worked as a civil servant and then as an insurance agent.  

Prandini was first elected to the Parliament in 1972 representing Christian Democrats. He was a member of the Parliament until 1994. He also served as a senator in the IX and X legislatures. 

Between 1983 and 1986 Prandini served as the undersecretary of the state ministry for foreign trade in the first cabinet of Prime Minister Bettino Craxi. He was the minister of merchant navy between 1987 and 1989 in the cabinet of Giovanni Goria and then in the cabinet of Ciriaco De Mita. Next he served as the minister of public works between 1989 and 1992 in the sixth and seventh cabinets of Giulio Andreotti. 

Prandini was married and had two sons who are also politicians. He died on 11 March 2018 in Brescia following a long-term illness.

Controversy
Prandini was involved in the Tangentopoli investigations under clean hands operation. He was sentenced to 6 years and 4 months in prison for bribes on Anas contracts. He was freed from the charge by a verdict of not guilty  due to the modifications in the related law. However, the process continued, and in February 2010 he was sentenced by the Court of Auditors to pay 5 million Euros for the abuse of power during his term as minister of public works.

References

External links

1940 births
2018 deaths
Christian Democracy (Italy) politicians
Government ministers of Italy
Italian Ministers of Public Works
Italian politicians convicted of crimes
Deputies of Legislature VI of Italy
Deputies of Legislature VII of Italy
Deputies of Legislature VIII of Italy
Deputies of Legislature XI of Italy
Senators of Legislature XI of Italy
Senators of Legislature X of Italy
Politicians from Brescia